Eugene Conley (March 12, 1908 – December 18, 1981) was a celebrated American operatic tenor.

Born in Lynn, Massachusetts, Conley studied under Ettore Verna, and made his official debut as the Duke of Mantua in Rigoletto, at the Brooklyn Academy of Music in 1940.  In 1945, he first appeared with the New York City Opera, as Rodolfo in La bohème, and went on to appear with that company until 1950.  He also sang with the Opéra-Comique in Paris, the Teatro alla Scala in Milan (I puritani, 1950; then Les vêpres siciliennes opposite Maria Callas, 1951), and Covent Garden in London.

The tenor made his Metropolitan Opera debut in 1950, in the title role of Faust, and appeared with the Met many times until 1956.

On television, he appeared on "The Voice of Firestone" (1950–53) and "Cavalcade of Stars" (1951-52).

Conley was artist-in-residence at the University of North Texas College of Music from 1960 until his retirement in 1978.  From 1960 to 1967, he directed its Opera Workshop.  In his retirement year, he presented a joint recital at Alice Tully Hall, Lincoln Center, with soprano Maria Powell.  Among his students was Henry Price (tenor).  He died in Denton, Texas, at the age of seventy-three.

Conley's discography includes complete recordings of Faust (with Eleanor Steber and Cesare Siepi, for Columbia, 1951), the first recording of The Rake's Progress (conducted by the composer, Igor Stravinsky, for Columbia, 1953), and Beethoven's Missa Solemnis (conducted by Arturo Toscanini, for RCA, 1953).  In 1999, VAI published, on Compact Discs, a 1952 performance of Rigoletto from the New Orleans Opera Association, with Leonard Warren, Hilde Gueden, Conley, and the young Norman Treigle as Count Monterone, conducted by Walter Herbert.  A "pirated" recording of the Verdi Requiem exists, with Herva Nelli and Conley, conducted by Guido Cantelli (1954).

Conley's recording of the aria, "Here I Stand - Since It Is Not by Merit," from Stravinsky's The Rake's Progress, was featured on the film soundtrack for the 2018 Ruth Bader Ginsburg biographic film, "On the Basis of Sex."

Conley also performed at the Presidential Inaugurations of President Nixon and President Eisenhower.

References

 The Metropolitan Opera Encyclopedia, edited by David Hamilton, Simon and Schuster, 1987.

External links 
 Eugene Conley in an excerpt from I puritani (1950, audio only).

1908 births
1981 deaths
American operatic tenors
University of North Texas College of Music faculty
20th-century American male opera singers